Coleophora lycaoniae is a moth of the family Coleophoridae. It is found in central Turkey.

References

lycaoniae
Endemic fauna of Turkey
Moths described in 1994
Moths of Asia